Alive and Well is the ninth studio album by heavy metal band Quiet Riot. It was recorded following a reunion of the classic 1980s Quiet Riot lineup of Kevin DuBrow, Rudy Sarzo, Carlos Cavazo, and Frankie Banali. It featured eight new songs alongside updated versions of six of their classics, including "Cum On Feel The Noize", "Metal Health" and "Mama Weer All Crazee Now", as well as a cover of "Highway to Hell" by AC/DC. This track had previously been released on the AC/DC tribute album Thunderbolt: A Tribute To AC/DC.

The DuBrow/Perris penned "Slam Dunk" was first recorded in 1991 by Pretty Boy Floyd for the movie Switch.

Track listing

The Japanese version of the CD has a bonus track titled "The Wait".

Credits

Quiet Riot
Kevin DuBrow – lead vocals
Carlos Cavazo – guitars
Rudy Sarzo – bass
Frankie Banali – drums

Production
Bob Marlette – producer
Ken DiMaio - Live Sound Engineer

References

Quiet Riot albums
1999 albums
Albums produced by Bob Marlette
Cleopatra Records albums